Caroline Veyre (born October 4, 1988)  is an amateur boxer from Canada. She won a gold medal in the women's lightweight category at the 2015 Pan American Games.

She represented Canada at the 2020 Summer Olympics.

References

External links
 

1998 births
Living people
Canadian women boxers
Pan American Games gold medalists for Canada
Boxers at the 2015 Pan American Games
Boxers from Montreal
Boxers from Paris
Pan American Games medalists in boxing
Boxers at the 2018 Commonwealth Games
Commonwealth Games competitors for Canada
Light-welterweight boxers
Medalists at the 2015 Pan American Games
Olympic boxers of Canada
Boxers at the 2020 Summer Olympics